Llandudno is a seaside suburb of Cape Town on the Atlantic seaboard of the Cape Peninsula in the Western Cape, South Africa. There are no street lights, shops or commercial activities, and the town has some of the most expensive residential property in South Africa.

Llandudno Beach is one of the Cape's most naturally diverse beaches, surrounded by large granite boulders and overlooked by mountains.  It is a popular surfing spot, but the swimming can be treacherous, with rough seas and extremely cold water. Llandudno has lifeguards on duty during the summer season, operated by the Llandudno Surf Lifesaving club. It is also the access point for the walk to Sandy Bay, an isolated beach still popular with nudists.

On 26 September 1903 the valley was declared a township and named Llandudno after the North Wales seaside resort of Llandudno, which means "Parish of Saint Tudno" in the Welsh language. The striking similarities between Kleinkommetjie Bay in which the valley resides and Llandudno in Wales were noted as reasons for choosing this name.

References

External links 
 
 Llandudno, South Africa
 Llandudno Map A street map of Llandudno

Suburbs of Cape Town
Surfing locations in South Africa